The year 1747 in architecture involved some significant events.

Events

Buildings and structures

Buildings

 Sanssouci in Potsdam, designed by Georg Wenzeslaus von Knobelsdorff, is completed.
 Schlosstheater Schönbrunn in Vienna, designed by Nicolò Pacassi, is completed.
 Pálffy Palace (Bratislava) is built.
 Reconstruction of church of Santi Quaranta Martiri e San Pasquale Baylon, Rome, by Giuseppe Sardi is completed.
 Visitation of Mary Church (Ljubljana), designed by Candido Zulliani, is consecrated.
 The tower of St. Mary's Church, Rotherhithe, London, is built by Lancelot Dowbiggin.
 Usk Bridge (Usk), Monmouthshire, designed by William Edwards, is completed.

Births
 Vincenzo Brenna, Florentine-born architect (died 1820)

Deaths
 April 24 – Johann Georg Fischer, German architect (born 1673)

References 

Architecture
Years in architecture
18th-century architecture